Westwood is a surname. Notable people with the surname include:

Barry Westwood, presenter of "Day by Day" on Southern Television
Bill Westwood (1925–1999), Anglican bishop in England, father of DJ Tim Westwood
Brett Westwood, British naturalist, radio presenter and author
Bryan Westwood (1930–2000), Australian artist
David Westwood, British police officer
Hugh Westwood, English politician
Ian Westwood, English cricketer
Jim Westwood, British computer engineer
John Obadiah Westwood (1805–1893), British entomologist
John Portsmouth Football Club Westwood (born 1963), bookseller and football fan
Joseph Westwood (1884–1948), Scottish politician
Julie Westwood (born 1952), American voice actress
Karen Westwood, British actress
Keiren Westwood (born 1984), Irish international football player
Lee Westwood (born 1973), British golfer
Tifania Westwood, a fictional elf
Tim Westwood (born 1957), British hip hop DJ, son of Bishop Bill Westwood
Troy Westwood (born 1967), Canadian football player
Vivienne Westwood (1941–2022), English fashion designer
William Westwood (1821–1846), British-born Australian bushranger known as Jackey Jackey
William James Westwood (1887–1954), Canadian politician

See also
 Westwood (disambiguation)
 

English-language surnames